The assassination of Prime Minister Luis Carrero Blanco, also known by its code name Operación Ogro, had far-reaching consequences within the politics of Spain. Admiral Carrero Blanco was killed in Madrid by the Basque separatist group ETA on 20 December 1973. The assassination is considered to have been the biggest attack against the Francoist State since the end of the Spanish Civil War in 1939.

The death of Carrero Blanco had numerous political implications. By the end of 1973, the physical health of dictator Francisco Franco had declined significantly, and it epitomized the final crisis of the Francoist regime. ETA, on the other hand, consolidated its place as a relevant armed group and would evolve to become one of the main opponents of Francoism.

Attack
An ETA commando unit using the code name Txikia (after the nom de guerre of ETA activist Eustakio Mendizabal, killed by the Guardia Civil in April 1973) rented a basement flat at Calle Claudio Coello 104, Madrid, on the route by which Blanco regularly went to mass at San Francisco de Borja church.

Over five months, the unit dug a tunnel under the street – telling the landlord that they were student sculptors to hide their true purpose.

On 20 December at 9:36 AM, a three-man ETA commando unit disguised as electricians detonated the explosives by command wire as Blanco's Dodge Dart passed. The blast sent Blanco and his car  into the air and over the five-story church, landing on the second-floor terrace of the opposite side. Blanco survived the blast but died at 10:15 AM in hospital. His bodyguard and driver died shortly afterwards. The "electricians" shouted to stunned passers-by that there had been a gas explosion, and then fled in the confusion. ETA claimed responsibility on 22 January 1974.

In a collective interview justifying the attack, the ETA bombers said:

The killing was not condemned and was, in some cases, even welcomed by the Spanish opposition in exile. According to Laura Desfor Edles, professor of sociology at California State University, Northridge, some analysts consider the assassination of Carrero Blanco to be the only thing the ETA have ever done to "further the cause of Spanish democracy". However, former ETA member turned writer Jon Juaristi contended that ETA's goal with the killing was not democratization but a spiral of violence to fully destabilize Spain, heighten Franco's repression against Basque nationalism and force the average Basque citizen to support the lesser evil in the form of the ETA against Franco.

Reaction

A government meeting about the "dangers of subversion threatening Spain" was scheduled to take place on 20 December 1973. Both Carrero Blanco and the United States Secretary of State, Henry Kissinger, had expressed concern about a left-wing uprising during the meeting they held on 19 December. When government officials reached the Palace of Villamejor, they learned about Carrero Blanco's death. Deputy Prime Minister Torcuato Fernández Miranda demanded calm and announced that he was going to call Franco so that Franco could decide what to do next. After the call, Fernández Miranda proclaimed himself prime minister, in accordance with the dispositions laid out in the Organic Law of the State. His first decision as prime minister was to decline to declare a state of exception.

Gabriel Pita da Veiga, Minister of the Navy, informed Fernández Miranda that , Director-General of the Civil Guard, had decided to "maximize surveillance" and ordered agents through a telegram not to hesitate to use deadly force if any clash occurred. However, Fernández Miranda was opposed and made Iniesta Cano reverse this order immediately through a telegram.

See also
 Cassandra case, student prosecuted for posting a series of tweets poking fun at the assassination of Luis Carrero Blanco
 Operación Ogro, a film about the attack by Gillo Pontecorvo
 The Last Circus, a film where the attack is a minor part of the plot

References

1973 in Spain
1970s in Madrid
1973 murders in Spain
Assassinations in Spain
Deaths by person in Spain
Francoist Spain
Terrorism in Spain
ETA (separatist group) actions
Films with screenplays by Ugo Pirro